San Antonio Rose is a studio album by American country music artists Willie Nelson and Ray Price. It was released in 1980 via Columbia Records. The album peaked at number 3 on the Billboard Top Country Albums chart.

Price had recorded an album by the same title in 1961 as a tribute to Bob Wills, on which Nelson played acoustic guitar.

Track listing
"San Antonio Rose" (Bob Wills) – 3:42
"I'll Be There (If You Ever Want Me)" (Rusty Gabbard, Ray Price) – 2:41
"I Fall to Pieces" (Hank Cochran, Harlan Howard) – 3:16
"Crazy Arms" (Ralph Mooney, Chuck Seals) – 2:41
"Release Me" (Eddie Miller, Dub Williams, Robert Yount) – 3:06
"Don't You Ever Get Tired (Of Hurting Me)" (Hank Cochran) – 3:39
"This Cold War with You" (Floyd Tillman) – 3:19
"Funny How Time Slips Away" (Willie Nelson) – 3:50
"Night Life" (Walt Breeland, Paul Buskirk, Willie Nelson) – 4:03
"Deep Water" (Fred Rose) – 2:45
"Faded Love" (Bob Wills, Johnnie Lee Wills) – 3:50
Crystal Gayle, backing vocals

2003 CD reissue bonus tracks

 "Just Call Me Lonesome" (Rex Griffin) – 3:21
"My Life's Been a Pleasure" (Jesse Ashlock) – 2:07

Chart performance

Certifications

References

1980 albums
Willie Nelson albums
Ray Price (musician) albums
Columbia Records albums
Collaborative albums
Vocal duet albums